The Maine Wing of Civil Air Patrol (CAP) is the highest echelon of Civil Air Patrol in the state of Maine. Maine Wing headquarters are located in Augusta, Maine. The Maine Wing consists of over 300 cadet and adult members at over 10 locations across the state of Maine.

Mission
The Maine Wing of Civil Air Patrol performs the three missions of Civil Air Patrol: providing emergency services; offering cadet programs for youth; and providing aerospace education for both CAP members and the general public.

Emergency services
The Maine Wing of the performs emergency services missions, including assisting the Maine State Police in searching for missing or overdue aircraft, as well as the prosecuting of emergency distress beacons as reported by the Air Force Rescue Coordination Center. Members of the Maine Wing train to obtain Incident Command Staff, Ground Team, and Air Crew Search And Rescue (SAR) qualifications. The wing also performs aerial photography missions following natural disasters, as well as performing search and rescue missions. The wing has a Critical Incident Stress Management team used to assess members and non-members for signs of trauma or stress when responding to an emergency.

Cadet programs
Civil Air Patrol offers cadet programs for youth aged 12 to 21, which includes aerospace education, leadership training, physical fitness and moral leadership. The Maine Wing offers an annual encampment where cadets are provided with additional training.

Aerospace education
Civil Air Patrol provides education to youth through cadet programs and through educational material provided to teachers through the education system. Adult members may assist in providing aerospace education to cadets.

Organization

See also
Maine Air National Guard
Maine State Guard

References

External links
Maine Wing Civil Air Patrol official website

Wings of the Civil Air Patrol
Education in Maine
Military in Maine
Augusta, Maine